Science and technology in Brussels, the central region of Belgium (Europe), is well developed with the presence of several universities and research institutes.

Technology institutes and universities

Technology institutes 
The Brussels-Capital Region is home to several national science and technology institutes.

National Fund for Scientific Research (NFWO/FNRS)
Institute for the Encouragement of Scientific Research and Innovation of Brussels (ISRIB)
Francqui Foundation
Queen Elisabeth Medical Foundation
Royal Academies for Science and the Arts of Belgium (RASAB)
Belgian Academy Council of Applied Sciences (BACAS)
Von Karman Institute for Fluid Dynamics

Universities 
Funded by the Flemish government, teaching in Dutch and (for some post-graduate programs) in English:
 Vrije Universiteit Brussel (VUB) with its partner college Erasmushogeschool Brussel (EhB).
 Katholieke Universiteit Leuven (KU Leuven) campus Brussel (human sciences) and campus Sint-Lukas Brussel (architecture) with its partner college Odisee.

Funded by the government of the French Community, teaching in French and in English, with some programmes in Dutch:
 Université libre de Bruxelles (ULB) in Brussels, Ixelles and Anderlecht.
 Université Saint-Louis - Bruxelles (UCLouvain) in Brussels and Ixelles.
 Université catholique de Louvain's (UCLouvain) Brussels Woluwe medical campus and architecture campus in Saint-Gilles.

Science parks
Several science parks associated with the universities are spread over the Brussels-Capital Region.

See also
 Agoria
 Belgian Federal Science Policy Office (BELSPO)
 Economy of Belgium
 Science and technology in Belgium
 Science and technology in Flanders
 Science and technology in Wallonia

External links
Presentation of R&D policies in Belgium (European Commission website, ERAWATCH)
Presentation of innovation policies in Belgium (European Commission website, ProInno TrendChart for Innovation)
 Science in Homes

Science and technology in Belgium
Brussels

Economy of Brussels